Muro Club de Fútbol is a Spanish football team based in Muro de Alcoy, in the autonomous community of Valencia. Founded in 1930, for the 2022-23 season it plays in Regional Preferente – Group 3, holding home games at La Llometa, which has a capacity of 1,000 spectators.

Season to season

6 seasons in Tercera División

External links
Futbolme team profile 

Football clubs in the Valencian Community
Association football clubs established in 1930
1930 establishments in Spain